Florian Riza (born 13 July 1969) is an Albanian pundit and former professional footballer who played as a centre-forward for Albanian club Tirana as well as spending one season in Turkey in Demirspor.

Honours
Tirana
Kategoria Superiore: 1987–88, 1988–89, 1995–96, 1996–97, 1999–2000
Kupa e Shqipërisë: 1993–94, 1995–96,1998–99, 2000–01
Superkupa e Shqipërisë: 1994, 2000

References

1969 births
Living people
Footballers from Tirana
Albanian footballers
Association football forwards
KF Tirana players
Adana Demirspor footballers
Kategoria Superiore players
Süper Lig players
Albanian expatriate footballers
Expatriate footballers in Turkey
Albanian expatriate sportspeople in Turkey